is a Japanese actress best known for her performances in pink films. She was given Best Actress awards at the Pink Grand Prix for her work in this genre in 1990, 1992 and 1994.

Life and career 
Kiyomi Itō made her film debut in Ryūji Akitsu's High School Girl: Thrill of the Chase (1984). The same year she starred in prominent  director Hisayasu Satō's directorial debut,  aka Distorted Sense of Touch, and she became closely associated with Satō's work from that point on. Embodying what Jasper Sharp calls, "the dark heart at the centre of Hisayasu Satō's narratives", not only was Itō was one of the few actresses who would regularly submit to Satō's extreme cinematic vision, she also collaborated on several of Satō's scripts.

Itō's performance in Satō's Love - 0 = Infinity (1994, originally released as ) earned her the Best Actress award at the first Pink Grand Prix. The film was also selected as the sixth best pink release of the year at the ceremony. When Kei Mizutani refused to appear in Weather Girl R, the sequel to her surprise 1993 cult-hit Weather Girl, Bandai Home Video chose Itō to take over Mizutani's part. Itō has also directed, helming the opening segment of the four-part gay pink film The Gays in Wonderland (1997).

Bibliography

English

Japanese

References

 
|-
! colspan="3" style="background: #DAA520;" | Pink Grand Prix
|-

|-

|-

Japanese film actresses
Pink film actors
Living people
Year of birth missing (living people)